Marek Kaljumäe (born 18 February 1991) is an Estonian footballer who plays for Tallinna Kalev. Kaljumäe plays mainly as a defensive midfielder but can also play as a defender.

Club career

Early career
Kaljumäe came through the SC Real youth system, where he was coached by Aivar Tiidus. In August 2009, he moved to the Netherlands, where he joined the AZ youth academy.

Kaljumäe joined Eerste Divisie club Telstar on loan for the 2010–11 season. He made a single appearance in the Eerste Divisie on 6 May 2011, in a 1–5 loss to Helmond Sport.

Levadia
On 1 July 2011, Kaljumäe signed a one-and-a-half year contract with Levadia. He made his debut in the Meistriliiga on 9 July 2011, against Kuressaare. Kaljumäe won the Estonian Cup in 2012. He won his first Meistriliiga title in the 2013 season. On 8 January 2014, Kaljumäe signed a one-year contract extension with Levadia. He won his second Estonian Cup in 2014, and his second Meistriliiga title in the 2014 season.

Narva Trans
On 5 March 2015, Kaljumäe joined Meistriliiga club Narva Trans on a one-year deal.

Return to Levadia
On 29 February 2016, returned to Levadia on a one-year contract.

PS Kemi
On 18 January 2017, Kaljumäe signed one-year contract with Finnish Veikkausliiga club PS Kemi.

Return to Levadia again
Kaljumäe returned to Levadia for the third time. He signed a one-year contract on 27 December 2018, with an option to extend the contract for further one year.

International career
Kaljumäe has represented Estonia at youth levels, playing for the under-17, under-18, under-19, under-21, and under-23 national sides.

Kaljumäe made his senior international debut for Estonia on 19 November 2017, in a 2–0 away victory over Fiji in a friendly.

Honours

Club
Levadia
Meistriliiga: 2013, 2014
Estonian Cup: 2011–12, 2013–14
Estonian Supercup: 2013

References

External links

1991 births
Living people
Footballers from Tallinn
Estonian footballers
Association football defenders
Association football midfielders
AZ Alkmaar players
Eerste Divisie players
SC Telstar players
Esiliiga players
Meistriliiga players
FCI Levadia Tallinn players
JK Narva Trans players
JK Tallinna Kalev players
Veikkausliiga players
Kemi City F.C. players
Estonia youth international footballers
Estonia under-21 international footballers
Estonia international footballers
Estonian expatriate footballers
Estonian expatriate sportspeople in the Netherlands
Expatriate footballers in the Netherlands
Estonian expatriate sportspeople in Finland
Expatriate footballers in Finland
FCI Levadia U21 players
Pärnu JK Vaprus players